Petra Nareks (born 27 September 1982) is a Slovene judoka from the city of Celje. She is a six times medalist in the European Championships in the under 52 kg category.

Achievements

European Championships 
 3rd – Maribor (2002)
 2nd – Düsseldorf (2003)
 3rd – Bucharest (2004)
 5th – Rotterdam (2005)
 3rd – Tampere (2006)
 3rd – Belgrade (2007))
 3rd  – Lisbon (2008)

References

External links

 
 
 

Slovenian female judoka
Judoka at the 2004 Summer Olympics
Olympic judoka of Slovenia
1982 births
Living people
Sportspeople from Celje
European Games bronze medalists for Slovenia
European Games medalists in judo
Judoka at the 2015 European Games
Mediterranean Games silver medalists for Slovenia
Mediterranean Games bronze medalists for Slovenia
Competitors at the 2001 Mediterranean Games
Competitors at the 2005 Mediterranean Games
Competitors at the 2009 Mediterranean Games
Competitors at the 2013 Mediterranean Games
Mediterranean Games medalists in judo
21st-century Slovenian women